The Vienna offensive was an offensive launched by the Soviet 2nd and 3rd Ukrainian Fronts in order to capture Vienna, Austria, during World War II. The offensive lasted from 16 March to 15 April 1945. After several days of street-to-street  fighting, the Soviet troops captured the city.

Background
Vienna had been bombarded continuously for the year before the arrival of Soviet troops, and many buildings and facilities had been damaged and destroyed.

Joseph Stalin reached an agreement with the Western Allies prior to April 1945 concerning the relative postwar political influence of each party in much of Eastern and Central Europe; however, these agreements said virtually nothing about the fate of Austria, then officially considered to be merely the Ostmark area of Greater Germany after the Anschluss. As a result, the success of a Soviet offensive against Austria and subsequent liberation by the Red Army of a large part of the country would have been very beneficial for subsequent postwar negotiations with the Western Allies.

After the failure of Operation Spring Awakening (Unternehmen Frühlingserwachen), Sepp Dietrich's 6th SS Panzer Army retreated in stages to the Vienna area. The Germans desperately prepared defensive positions in an attempt to guard the city against the rapidly arriving Soviets.

In the Spring of 1945, the advance of Soviet Marshal Fyodor Tolbukhin's 3rd Ukrainian Front through western Hungary gathered momentum on both sides of the Danube. After they took Sopron and Nagykanizsa, they crossed the border between Hungary and Austria.

On 25 March, the 2nd Ukrainian Front launched the Bratislava–Brno offensive by crossing the Hron river. On 30 March the Front crossed also the Nitra river and quickly rushed across the Danubian Lowland towards Bratislava. Having secured his right wing by 2nd Ukrainian Front, Tolbukhin was now ready to advance into Austria and take Vienna. Romanian troops, that were on the Allied side since King Michael's Coup, also took part in the offensive.

The siege 

On 2 April, Vienna Radio denied that the Austrian capital had been declared an open city. On the same day, Soviet troops approached Vienna from the south after they overran Wiener Neustadt, Eisenstadt, Neunkirchen and Gloggnitz. Baden and Bratislava were overrun on 4 April.

After arriving in the Vienna area, the armies of the Soviet 3rd Ukrainian Front surrounded, besieged, and attacked the city. Involved in this action were the Soviet 4th Guards Army, the Soviet 6th Guards Tank Army, the Soviet 9th Guards Army, and the Soviet 46th Army. The "O-5 Resistance Group," Austrians led by Carl Szokoll, wanting to spare Vienna destruction, actively attempted to sabotage the German defenses and to aid the entry of the Red Army.

The only major German force facing the Soviet attackers was the German II SS Panzer Corps of the 6th SS Panzer Army, along with ad hoc forces made up of garrison and anti-aircraft units. Declared a defensive region, Vienna's defense was commanded by General Rudolf von Bünau, with the II SS Panzer Corps units under the command of SS General Wilhelm Bittrich.

The battle for the Austrian capital was characterized in some cases by fierce urban combat, but there were also parts of the city the Soviets advanced into with little opposition. Defending in the Prater Park was the 6th Panzer Division, along the south side of the city were the 2nd and 3rd SS Panzer Divisions, and in the north was the Führer-Grenadier Division. The Soviets assaulted Vienna's eastern and southern suburbs with the 4th Guards Army and part of the 9th Guards Army. The German defenders kept the Soviets out of the city's southern suburbs until 7 April. However, after successfully achieving several footholds in the southern suburbs, the Soviets then moved into the western suburbs of the city on 8 April with the 6th Guards Tank Army and the bulk of the 9th Guards Army. The western suburbs were especially important to the Soviets because they included Vienna's main railway station. The Soviet success in the western suburbs was followed quickly by infiltration of the eastern and northern suburbs later the same day. North of the Danube River, the 46th Army pushed westward through Vienna's northern suburbs. Central Vienna was now cut off from the rest of Austria.

By the 9th of April, the Soviet troops began to infiltrate the center of the city, but the street fighting continued for several more days. On the night of 11 April, the 4th Guards Army stormed the Danube canals, with the 20th Guards Rifle Corps and 1st Mechanized Corps moving on the Reichsbrücke Bridge. In a coup de main on 13 April, the Danube Flotilla landed troops of the 80th Guards Rifle Division and 7th Guards Airborne Division on both sides of the bridge, cutting demolition cables and securing the bridge. However, other important bridges were destroyed. Vienna finally fell when the last defenders in the city surrendered on the same day. Bittrich's II SS Panzer Corps, however, pulled out to the west on the evening of 13 April to avoid encirclement. The same day, the 46th Army took Essling and the Danube Flotilla landed naval infantry up the river by Klosterneuburg.

While the street fighting was still intensifying in the southern and western suburbs of Vienna on 8 April, other troops of the 3rd Ukrainian Front by-passed Vienna altogether and advanced on Linz and Graz.
 
On the 10th, all but two of the bridges in the city had been destroyed.  The Floridsdorf bridge had been left intact by a Führer Order dictating that the bridge be held at all costs. The 2nd SS Panzer, "Das Reich" left a dozen artillery pieces including 37mm anti-aircraft guns to hold off enemy attacks.  That night, the "Das Reich", including their last remaining three dozen armored vehicles, pulled out of the city for the last time. Vienna had fallen, and the Germans now moved northwest to hold the next defensive line.

Aftermath

By 15 April, armies of the Soviet 3rd Ukrainian Front pushed even further into Austria. The completely exhausted remnants of what had been the 6th SS Panzer Army were forced to flee to the area between Vienna and Linz. In pursuit of the retreating Germans were elements of the Soviet 9th Guards Army and the Soviet 46th Army. The 26th Army and 27th Armies advanced towards the area north of Graz just behind the retreating 6th Army. The 57th Army and the Bulgarian 1st Army advanced towards the area south of Graz (near Maribor) just behind the retreating 2nd Panzer Army. None of these German armies were in any shape to do more than temporarily stall the advancing Soviet forces.

Some of Vienna's finest buildings lay in ruins after the battle. There was no water, electricity, or gas — and bands of people, both foreigners and Austrians, plundered and assaulted the helpless residents in the absence of a police force. While the Soviet assault forces generally behaved well, the second wave of Soviet troops to arrive in the city were reportedly badly undisciplined. A large number of lootings and cases of rape took place in a several-week long violence that has been compared to the worst aspects of the Thirty Years War.

Like Bittrich, General von Bünau left Vienna before it fell to avoid capture by the Soviets. From 16 April until the war's end, he led Generalkommando von Bünau, surrendering to the Americans on VE Day. Von Bünau was held as a POW until April 1947. Bittrich also surrendered to U.S. forces and was held as a prisoner by the Allies until 1954. Fyodor Tolbukhin went on to command the Soviet Southern Group of Forces and the Transcaucasian Military District until his death in 1949.

Austrian politician Karl Renner set up a Provisional Government in Vienna sometime in April with the tacit approval of the victorious Soviet forces, and declared Austria's secession from the Third Reich.

Final orders of battle (after the Vienna offensive)

Axis forces
On 30 April, the following order of battle was recorded by the German Army High Command (Oberkommando der Wehrmacht, or OKW). From 20 April-2 May, OKW moved from Zossen (near Berlin) to Mürwik (part of Flensburg in north Germany, near Denmark). This order of battle shows what remained "on paper" of the German armies that fought in Hungary and Austria.
 
German 6th SS Panzer Army – east of Linz
I SS Panzer Corps
1st SS Panzer Division
12th SS Panzer Division
37th SS Volunteer Cavalry Division
710th Infantry division
356th Infantry division
II SS Panzer Corps
3rd SS Panzer Division Totenkopf
2nd SS Panzer Division
9th SS Panzer Division Hohenstaufen
Führer Grenadier Division
6th Panzer division
Hungarian 1st Hussar division
Hungarian 1st Mountain brigade
German 6th Army – north of Graz
9th Mountain Division (Wehrmacht) (near Semmering)
117th Jäger Division (arriving 12 April)
III Panzer Corps
1st Volk's Gebirgs Division
1st Panzer Division
IV SS Panzer Corps
3rd Panzer Division (Wehrmacht)
5th SS Panzer Division
14th SS Grenadier Division
Elements of the Wehrkreiskommando XVIII (Military District XVIII)
German 2nd Panzer Army – south of Graz (near Maribor)
I Cavalry Corps
23rd Panzer Division
4th Cavalry Division
3rd Cavalry Division
16th SS Panzergrenadier Division
XXII Mountain Corps
Hungarian Szent László Infantry Division
118th Jäger Division
297th Infantry Division
711th Infantry Division
LXVIII Corps
71st Infantry Division
13th SS Alpine Division

Soviet and Allied forces

The order of battle for the 3rd Ukrainian Front during the same period was:

4th Guards Army
20th Guards Rifle Corps
5th Guards Airborne Division
7th Guards Airborne Division
80th Guards Rifle Division
21st Guards Rifle Corps
41st Guards Rifle Division
62nd Guards Rifle Division
66th Guards Rifle Division
69th Guards Rifle Division
31st Guards Rifle Corps
4th Guards Rifle Division
34th Guards Rifle Division
40th Guards Rifle Division
6th Guards Tank Army
5th Guards Tank Corps
9th Guards Mechanized Corps
9th Guards Army
37th Guards Rifle Corps
98th Guards Rifle Division
99th Guards Rifle Division
103rd Guards Rifle Division
38th Guards Rifle Corps
104th Guards Rifle Division
105th Guards Rifle Division
106th Guards Rifle Division
39th Guards Rifle Corps
100th Guards Rifle Division
107th Guards Rifle Division
114th Guards Rifle Division
26th Army
30th Rifle Corps
36th Guards Rifle Division
68th Guards Rifle Division
21st Rifle Division
104th Rifle Corps
74th Rifle Division
93rd Rifle Division
151st Rifle Division
135th Rifle Corps
233rd Rifle Division
236th Rifle Division

27th Army
35th Guards Rifle Corps
Guards Airborne Division
163rd Rifle Division
202nd Rifle Division
33rd Rifle Corps
78th Rifle Division
155th Rifle Division
206th Rifle Division
337th Rifle Division
37th Rifle Corps
108th Guards Rifle Division
316th Rifle Division
320th Rifle Division
57th Army
6th Guards Rifle Corps
10th Guards Airborne Division
20th Guards Rifle Division
61st Guards Rifle Division
64th Rifle Corps
73rd Guards Rifle Division
113th Rifle Division
299th Rifle Division
133rd Rifle Corps
84th Rifle Division
104th Rifle Division
122nd Rifle Division
17th Air Army
5th Guards Cavalry Corps
1st Guards Mechanized Corps
18th Tank Corps
2nd Breakthrough Artillery Corps
9th Breakthrough Artillery Division
19th Breakthrough Artillery Division
7th Breakthrough Artillery Division
3rd Anti-aircraft Artillery Division
4th Anti-aircraft Artillery Division
9th Anti-aircraft Artillery Division
22nd Anti-aircraft Artillery Division
1st Bulgarian Army
III Corps
10th Infantry Division
12th Infantry Division
16th Infantry Division
IV Corps
3rd Infantry Division
8th Infantry Division
11th Infantry Division
6th Infantry Division

See also
Anschluss
Battle of Berlin
Bombing of Vienna in World War II
Eastern Front (World War II)
History of Germany during World War II
Battle of Budapest – 1944/45
Operation Frühlingserwachen – 1945
Battle of the Transdanubian Hills – 1945
Nagykanizsa–Körmend offensive – 1945
Prague offensive – 1945
Soviet 3rd Ukrainian Front
German 6th SS Panzer Army
End of World War II in Europe
Siege of Vienna (1529)
Battle of Vienna (1683)

Explanatory notes

References

Sources

Further reading
 

World War II aerial operations and battles of the Eastern Front
Battles and operations of the Soviet–German War
Battles involving the Soviet Union
Battles involving Hungary
Conflicts in 1945
Urban warfare
Strategic operations of the Red Army in World War II
Austria in World War II
1945 in Austria
Austria–Soviet Union relations
Military operations of World War II involving Germany
Military operations of World War II involving Bulgaria
1940s in Vienna
April 1945 events